Smith is a small unincorporated community in Lyon County, Nevada.

History
The first settlement at Smith was made in 1859. The community was named after the T. B. Smith family, which settled near the site. A post office was established at Smith in 1892.

Transportation
Air service is located at Rosaschi Air Park.

References 

Unincorporated communities in Lyon County, Nevada
Unincorporated communities in Nevada